"Carnival Girl" is a song by Scottish band Texas featuring Canadian rapper Kardinal Offishall. The single was released on 6 October 2003 and was the first to be taken from the band's seventh studio album, Careful What You Wish For (2003). The song reached number nine on the UK Singles Chart and became a top-20 hit in Denmark and Spain.

Track listings

UK CD1, European and Australian CD single 
 "Carnival Girl" – 4:07
 "Carnival Girl" (Kardinal Offishall remix) – 3:45

UK CD2 
 "Carnival Girl"
 "Night for Day"
 "Carnival of Dub" featuring Suncycle
 "Carnival Girl" (video)

European maxi-single 
 "Carnival Girl" – 4:08
 "Night for Day" – 3:44
 "Carnival Girl" (Kardinal Offishall remix) – 3:44
 "Carnival Girl" (video)

UK DVD single 
 "Carnival Girl" (video)
 "Silver Chain"
 "Carnival Girl" (Kardinal Offishall remix)

Credits and personnel
Credits are taken from the Careful What You Wish For album booklet.

Studios
 Recorded at various studios in Scotland, England, and Canada
 Mastered at Metropolis Mastering (London, England)

Personnel

 Sharleen Spiteri – writing, vocals, guitar, piano, keyboards
 Johnny McElhone – writing, guitar, bass, piano, keyboards, programming
 Kardinal Offishall – writing (as Jason Harrow), featured vocals
 Tony McGovern – vocals, guitar, programming
 Ally McErlaine – guitar

 Eddie Campbell – piano, keyboards, programming
 Neil Payne – drums
 Johnny Mac – production
 Mark "Spike" Stent – mixing
 Tim Young – mastering

Charts

Release history

References

2003 singles
2003 songs
Kardinal Offishall songs
Mercury Records singles
Songs written by Johnny McElhone
Songs written by Kardinal Offishall
Songs written by Sharleen Spiteri
Texas (band) songs